Our Lady of Czestochowa Parish, which was designated for Polish immigrants at Dorchester Ave Dorchester, Massachusetts, was founded in 1893.

This is one of Polish-American Roman Catholic parishes in New England in the Archdiocese of Boston.

History 
Among the immigrants of many ethnic groups, who come to the United States at the end of the nineteenth century, there was a significant number of Poles, who for various reasons left their homeland. Relatively many of them settled in Boston, especially in the southern part of the town of Dorchester.
In 1893 to the Italian Sacred Heart Parish in Boston, arrived Polish priest, Fr. Jan M. Chmieliński

The group selected their representatives, who went to Archbishop John J. Williams, asking him to authorize Fr. Chmieliński to organize a Polish congregation. Archbishop John J. Williams has appointed Fr. Chmieliński, the pastor of the Polish Catholics of Boston, Salem and elsewhere.

In the meantime, a number of parish-related organizations were formed such as:

 Polish National Alliance (pol. Związek Narodowy Polski w USA),
 Polish Women's Alliance of American - PWAA (pol. Związek Polek W Ameryce),
 Polish Roman Catholic Union of America (pol. Zjednoczenie Polskie Rzymsko-Katolickie),
 Polish Falcons (pol. Polskie Towarzystwo Gimnastyczne "Sokół"'),
 (pol.) Macierz Polska,
 (pol.) Towarzystwo Bratniej Pomocy Studentów (pot. Bratniak,
 St. Anne's Society (pol. Towarzystwo św. Anny),
 Polish American Citizen Club (pol. Polsko-Amerykański Klub Obywatelski),
 Polish Army Veterans Association in America (pol. Stowarzyszenie Weteranów Armii Polskiej w Ameryce (SWAP)),
 (pol.) Koło Dramatu i Śpiewu

The architect for the 1903 building was T. Edward Sheehan of Dorchester, MA.

Between 1906 and 1908 three Felician nuns from Buffalo were brought in to teach in the basement of the church. In 1911 a school was completed including a hall in the basement for parish functions.  By 1926 school enrollment increased from an initial 103 students to 642.  Eight nuns and two lay teachers were hired with approximately 60 students per class.

After Fr. Chmielinski's death in 1937, Rev Bartula is appointed pastor followed by Rev. Naguszewski.  In 1940 Cardinal William O'Connell entrusts the parish to the Franciscan fathers.  Fr. Michael Cieslik. O.F.M. is the first Franciscan pastor and serves until 1942.  In 1942, Fr. Stephen Musielak, O.F.M. is appointed pastor and serves as pastor until 1957.  During that time, a club for teenagers and young adults was organized using the lower church hall for a meeting place. Fr. Musielak played a leading role in the settling of the post World War II wave of new Polish immigrants helping them locate family and friends in the US and finding lodging, securing employment, establishing residence and obtaining medical care.  From 1943 to 1951 post WWII immigrants and non-Polish families from Old Colony Housing Project create mixed school enrollment.  Classes are divided into two separate groups—1. exclusively in English and 2. Polish language as well as English.  In 1957 Fr. Angelus Zator is named pastor and services until 1966.  He establishes St. Mary's Drum and Bugle Corps as well as a Parent Teachers Association.

In 1967 Rev. Edwin Agonis, OFM becomes pastor.  In 1968 the church celebrates its 75th Diamond Jubilee with a concelebrated Mass presided over by Cardinal Richard Cushing.

In 1973 Rev Manual Wolkanowski OFM is appointed pastor through 1979.  Fire ravages the church causing disastrous damage.  Permission is granted by Cardinal Humberto Medeiros to repair and rebuild the church.  In 1978 Karol Jozef Wojtyla is elected Pope and takes the name, John Paul II.  In 1983, the church celebrates its 90th Anniversary.

In 1986, Cardinal Bernard Law during pilgrimage to the shrine in Kraków-Łagiewniki Poland, asked the Mother General of The Congregation of the Sisters of Our Lady of Mercy (pol. Zgromadzenie Sióstr Matki Bożej Miłosierdzia), Sr. Paulina Słomka, about the several sisters in Boston to establish a community of The Congregation of the Sisters of Our Lady of Mercy. The three sisters came to Boston on September 15, 1988, where they set up temporarily at the Convent in the Our Lady of Czestochowa Parish. It was the first international house founded outside of Poland. On October 10, 1993, the sisters moved to the current convent near St. Ann's Parish'' at the Neponset Ave. in Dorchester.

Pastors 
 Fr. Jan M. Chmieliński (1893–1934)
 Fr. Peter Bartula (1935–1938),
 Fr. Edward B. Naguszewski (1936–1940).

In 1940 Cardinal William Henry O'Connell entrusted the parish to the care of the Conventual Franciscans Fathers:
 Fr. Michael Cieślik OFM Conv (1940–1942)
 Fr. Stephen Musielak OFM Conv (1942–1957)
 Fr. Angelus Zator OFM Conv (1957–1966)
 Fr. Alfred Stopyra OFM Conv (1966–1967)
 Fr. Edwin Agonis OFM Conv (1967–1973)
 Fr. Manual Wolkanowski OFM Conv (1973–1979)
 Fr. John Bambol OFM Conv (1979–1985)
 Fr. Andrew Skiba OFM Conv (1985–1991)
 Fr. Paul Miśkiewicz OFM Conv (1991–1994)

In 1994 the parish was taken over by Conventual Franciscans from Polish Prowincja Matki Bożej Niepokalanej in Warszawa, Poland:
 Fr. Andrzej Sujka OFM Conv (1994–2000)
 Fr. Miroslaw Podymniak OFM Conv (2001–2006)
 Fr. Jerzy Auguścik OFM Conv (2006–2008)
 Fr. Andrzej Urbaniak OFM Conv (2008 - suspended in 2012)
 Fr. Jan Łempicki OFM Conv (2013–2015)
 Fr. Jerzy Żebrowski OFM Conv (2015–)

See also
List of churches in the Roman Catholic Archdiocese of Boston

References

Bibliography 
 
 

 The Official Catholic Directory in USA

External links 
 Our Lady Of Czestochowa - Diocesan information
 Our Lady Of Czestochowa - ParishesOnline.com
 Archdiocese of Boston
 School closing in DotNews (2008) 
 The Polish Triangle in DotNews (2008) 
 The Congregation of the Sisters of Our Lady of Mercy in Boston, Massachusetts
 Parish bulletins 

Roman Catholic parishes of Archdiocese of Boston
Polish-American Roman Catholic parishes in Massachusetts